The electricity sector in Brunei ranges from generation, transmission, distribution and sales of electricity in Brunei.

Regulator
Electricity sector in Brunei is regulated by the Department of Electrical Services (DES) under the Ministry of Energy.

Generation
In 2010, electricity generation in Brunei reached 3,862,000,000 kWh, in which 99% of it was generated from natural gas sources and the remaining 1% was from oil sources.

Power stations
 Belingus Power Station
 Berakas Power Station
 Bukit Panggal Power Station
 Gadong Power Station
 Jerudong Power Station
 Lumut Power Station
 Seria Power Station

Transmission
 66 kV transmission lines from Seria to Bandar Seri Begawan

See also

 Energy in Brunei
 Renewable energy in Brunei
 List of electricity sectors

References

Energy in Brunei